Fadia Stella (born 30 December 1974), is a Kenyan actress. She is best known for the roles in the films Caramel and Déjà mort.

Personal life
She was born on 30 December 1974 in Nairobi, Kenya.

Career
In 1998, she made her film debut Déjà mort with a minor role as 'Alain's friend'. Later in 2007, she made a lead role with the film Caramel. The film had its premier on May 20 at the 2007 Cannes Film Festival, in the Directors' Fortnight section. Later, the film ran for the Caméra d'Or as well. The film received critical acclaim and distributed in over 40 countries.

Filmography

See also
 List of LGBT-related films of 2007

References

External links
 

Living people
Kenyan film actresses
1974 births
People from Nairobi
21st-century Kenyan actresses